Euxton Villa Football Club is a football club based in Euxton, England. They are currently members of the North West Counties League Division One North and play at the Jim Fowler Memorial Ground, Euxton.

History
Formed in 1907, as Euxton, the club joined the West Lancashire League. In 1963, the club renamed to Euxton Villa. In 2022, the club was admitted into the North West Counties League Division One North.

Ground
The club currently play at Jim Fowler Memorial Ground, Euxton, named after the founder of the present day Euxton Villa.

References

Association football clubs established in 1907
1907 establishments in England
Football clubs in England
Football clubs in Lancashire
West Lancashire Football League
North West Counties Football League clubs